This is a list of swimming national records for Chile. They are the fastest time recorded by a swimmer capable of representing Chile for each recognized event.

These records are maintained by Chile's national swimming federation: Federación Chilena de Deportes Acuáticos (FECHIDA).

All records were set in finals unless noted otherwise.

Long Course (50 m)

Men

Women

Mixed relay

Short Course (25 m)

Men

Women

Mixed relay

References
General
Chilean Records 11 September 2022 updated
Specific

External links
FECHIDA web site

Chilean
Records
Chilean records
Swimming